The Council for Dance, Drama and Musical Theatre (CDMT), formerly known as the Council for Dance Education and Training (CDET), is the quality assurance and membership body for the professional dance, drama and musical theatre industries in the United Kingdom. CDMT was founded in 1979.

Overview
Accredits excellent professional training at full-time dance, drama and musical theatre schools—providing the industry benchmark of quality since 1979 
Validates the world's leading awarding organisations which offer performing arts qualifications
Works with Affiliates and Collaborative Bodies to develop the highest standards of programme provision across the performing arts
Recognises, by means of the Recognised Awards Scheme, pre-vocational dance, drama and musical theatre schools and teachers
Provides membership and other specialist services through the Conference of Professional Dance Schools, Awarding Organisations Committee, Steering Group for the Dance and Drama Awards (DaDA), Affiliate meetings and Graded Examinations Forum
Negotiates with government authorities on issues of education funding, policy and regulation
Manages a substantial public-facing online platform which promotes members and core services, as well as administering two information websites for DaDA dadainfo.org.uk and Graded Examinations gradedexams.com respectively
Publishes the UK Guide which is the definitive resource for those seeking information on quality provision in the sector (this is sponsored by Spotlight)
Operates a free comprehensive information service for students, parents, teachers, artists and employers

History 
In 1979, alarmed at the indifferent quality of what was being presented as appropriate professional training and education in dance, musical theatre and the related performing arts, a number of eminent artists met with representatives of the leading industry organisations to discuss how the sector could work together to ensure high standards of provision. What emerged was CDMT. Over the years CDMT has become the first point of contact for employers, students and teachers seeking information about high quality training, education and assessment not only dance and musical theatre, but also drama across the UK.

Mission 
The organisation works hand in hand with Accredited Schools and Validated Awarding organisations to ensure that professional training and assessments both remain abreast of current industry trends and, importantly, address the real world needs of employers, with the purpose of securing the supply of high quality practitioners for the future.

Accredited Schools 
CDMT ensures the provision of high quality professional dance, drama and musical theatre training through the accreditation of full-time performing arts schools. Accreditation is only awarded to those schools and colleges that have successfully undertaken a thorough and comprehensive institutional-level review by a panel of nominated industry experts.

Validated Awarding Organisations 
CDMT validates the world's leading awarding organisations offering graded, vocational and diploma examinations in dance, musical theatre and the performing arts, ensuring excellence in examination provision by carrying out quality assurance inspections and annual comparability studies of assessment standards.

Affiliates 
Affiliates are committed to working with CDMT to develop the highest standards in their scrutinised courses. Some programmes focus on progression towards a specific role in the performing arts, others encourage reflective practice in a work-based context, including continuing professional development, whilst others develop skills in research and analysis which contribute to the sector’s wider understanding of its history and contextual influences.

Recognised Awards scheme 
The Recognised Awards engage pre-vocational schools delivering provision across the performing arts, with associated teachers holding specialist teaching diplomas in dance, drama, musical theatre and music. This self-certification scheme makes a valuable contribution to the development of safe and professional standards of practice in pre- or non-vocational teaching settings.

Advocacy 
Advocacy on behalf of the sector is a significant CDMT undertaking. The organisation provides a UK-wide forum in which authorities, educators and employers can come together to discuss common concerns and work strategically to promote training, education and assessment. Membership services are coordinated through the Conference of Professional Schools, Awarding Organisations Committee and affiliate meetings.

CDMT website 
cdmt.org.uk is the primary source of up-to-date information on high quality provision across the sector, including an up-to-date list of membership and initiatives.

UK Guide 
CDMT publishes the annual UK Guide to professional training, education and assessment in dance, drama and musical theatre which is the definitive resource for those seeking information on quality provision in the sector. The publication is sponsored by Spotlight.

Dance and Drama Awards (DaDA) 
CDMT administers the steering group for the Dance and Drama Awards (DaDA) on behalf of members, which involves facilitating communications between the Education Funding Agency and schools delivering dance, drama and musical theatre courses within the scheme; developing briefing papers on funding for government ministers; and administering the DaDA information website dadainfo.org.uk on behalf of stakeholders.

Graded Examinations booklet and website 
CDMT coordinates and progresses cooperation across all Ofqual recognised organisations awarding graded examinations in dance, drama, music and musical theatre. Projects to date include the booklet Graded Exams: The Definitive Guide, its associated website gradedexams.com and many detailed sector reports.

Careers Conferences and Showcase Performances 
The most recent Careers Conference took place at the Liverpool Institute of Performing Arts in November 2017 which disseminated up-to-date guidance on careers, funding and training opportunities for prospective students and their parents, culminating in showcase performances by current students of CDMT Accredited Schools. Previous conferences have taken place at the Hammond, Chester, Elmhurst Ballet School, Birmingham. The next Careers Conference is organised for the Urdang Academy, at the Shaw Theatre, London on 25 November 2018.

Classifications 
CDMT members contribute to the sustainability and international profile of the UK creative industries. By supporting the performers, students and teachers of tomorrow, collectively they keep professional training and rigorous assessment as the two cornerstones of a dependable progression route to a career in the performing arts.

Accredited Schools

Validated awarding organisations 
CDMT validates offers graded, vocational and diploma examinations in the performing arts, carrying out quality assurance inspections and annual comparability studies of assessment standards.

Affiliates 
Some Affiliate programmes such as Access to Professional Training and Performing Arts Training focus on progression towards a specific role. Others, including Continuing Professional Development encourage reflective practice in a work-based context. Higher Education modules help users develop skills in research and analysis.

References

External links
 

Dance organizations
Dance in the United Kingdom
Dance education in the United Kingdom
Educational organisations based in the United Kingdom
1979 establishments in the United Kingdom
Organisations based in the London Borough of Camden
Organizations established in 1979
Performing arts education in the United Kingdom